Mogok (Shan:) is a town in the Thabeikkyin District of Mandalay Region of Myanmar, located  north of Mandalay and  north-east of Shwebo.

History 
Mogok is believed to have been founded in 1217 by three lost Shan hunters who discovered rubies at the base of a collapsed mountain. According to the tale, the hunters returned to their home in Momeik and offered the precious stones to the local saopha who established a village in what would become modern-day Mogok.

Following the 1885 Third Anglo-Burmese War in which the British conquered and annexed the hitherto independent Upper Burma, in 1886 the British launched a military expedition to "open up" the ruby mines at Mogok and make them available to British merchants. George Skelton Streeter, a gem expert and son of Edmund Streeter of the Streeters & Co Ltd jewellery company in London, accompanied the expedition and stayed there to work as a government valuer in the British-run mines.

In 2018, the Mogok commemorated the 800th anniversary of the city's founding.

Geography
At  in elevation, the city has a fairly temperate climate year-round, and is home to Bamar, Shan, Lisu, Palaung, and Karen ethnic groups, as well as Chinese, Indians and Gurkhas.
The city is composed of two towns, Mogok and Kyat Pyin. Mogok is four miles long and two miles wide. It is situated in a valley surrounded by a large number of mountains. Tourists that travel to this area need a special authorization and a guide person.

Climate
In contrast to the hot to sweltering, semi-arid Dry Zone, Mogok has a borderline humid subtropical (Köppen Cwa)/ subtropical highland climate (Cwb) characterised by a warm dry season with cold mornings from mid-November to mid-April, and a very warm and extremely rainy wet season akin to that of Kachin State, only less extreme in heat discomfort, from mid-April to mid-November.

Economy
Mogok and other villages nearby have been famous since ancient times for its gemstones, especially ruby and sapphire, but semi-precious stones such as spinel, lapis lazuli, garnet, moonstone, peridot and chrysoberyl are also found. The gems are found in alluvial marble gravels by means of panning, tunneling and digging pits by hand. There is little mechanization of the mining. The gravels derive from the metamorphosed limestones (marbles) of the Mogok metamorphic belt.

Gems are sold in markets in Mogok; however, foreigners require special permits to visit the town, and it is illegal to purchase/export gems from Myanmar other than from government licensed dealers.

90% of a certain version of the world's rubies come from Myanmar (Burma). There are many other ruby sources in the world such as Sri Lanka and various places in Africa. Only in terms of quality Mogok rubies are best. The red stones from there are prized for their purity and hue. Thailand buys the majority of Myanmar's gems.

Health care 
 Mogok General Hospital
Kyatpyin General hospital

Notes

Mogok Township
Township capitals of Myanmar
Populated places in Pyin Oo Lwin District